STB or StB may refer to:

Entertainment
 Shoot the Bullet, a 2005 game
 Star Trek Beyond, a 2016 film
 STB, rock trio with singer Sonia Tetlow
 STB (TV channel), Ukraine

Organisations
 Singapore Tourism Board
 STB Le Havre, a French basketball club
 StB, Czechoslovak secret police
 Societatea de Transport București, a public transport operator in Romania
 Süd-Thüringen-Bahn, a railway company, Thuringia, Germany
 Stubai Valley Railway, Tyrol, Austria, line number
 Surface Transportation Board, US federal regulator

Other uses
 Bachelor of Sacred Theology (Sacrae Theologiae Baccalaureus), a degree
 Set-top box, TV tuner feeding TV receiver
 STB, the prototype designation of the Type 74 Japanese main battle tank
 Steuerberater (StB), German tax advisor license
 Strut bar, an automotive suspension element